Grantham is an unincorporated community in southwestern Wayne County, North Carolina, United States.  Located southwest of the county seat, Goldsboro, it is located on U.S. Route 13 between Goldsboro and Newton Grove to the south. It is a small, close-knit community that has a large agricultural industry.

Grantham has a elementary school k-5 and a middle school for 6-8.  The mascot is the Bulldogs and the colors are green and white.
There was formerly a Grantham High School, but it no longer exists. Currently, a new middle school is being constructed and is set to be completed by 2015–2016 school year. Grantham is one of three feeder schools to Southern Wayne High School in nearby Dudley.  *Grantham Middle School was completed for the 2015–2016 school year.*

The town has one stop light that was recently put in after numerous years of being a flashing yellow light.

It has a grass field airport Cox-Grantham airfield with call sign 6nc0.

The elevation is 157 feet above sea level.

The town itself is dry, with three gas stations being the main commerce areas.  Grantham Store, Dannie's Grocery and The Friendly Mart. There is also a fire department, rescue squad, doctor's office, hardware store, bank, in addition to many family farms.  A Dollar General is now located in Grantham. The mayor of Grantham is "Big" Ed Stevens. 

The main churches are: Falling Creek Baptist, Falling Creek Methodist, Selah Christian, Eureka Christian, Jordan's Chapel Baptist, Church of God of Prophecy, and many more.

In addition to the Grantham family settling the area originally, other families included: Skinner, Pipkin, Bizzell, Hood, Cox, Herring, Casey, Bradshaw, Jernigan, Kelly, Cogdell, Perkins, Stevens, Warrick, Laws, Parker, Kennedy, Whitfield, Britt, Sutton, Blackman, Rose, Sasser, Brown, McCullen, Mozingo, Ingram, Thornton, Keen, Jordan, Jinnette, Best, Porter, Denning, and Williams.

Notable people
Allen Battle, MLB Player

References

Unincorporated communities in Wayne County, North Carolina
Unincorporated communities in North Carolina